Yentl is a 1983 American romantic musical drama film directed, co-written, co-produced by, and starring American entertainer Barbra Streisand. It is based on Isaac Bashevis Singer's short story "Yentl the Yeshiva Boy".

The film incorporates humor and music to tell the story of an Ashkenazi Jewish girl in Poland who decides to dress and live like a boy so that she can receive an education in Talmudic law after her father dies. The film's musical score and songs, composed by Michel Legrand, with lyrics by Alan and Marilyn Bergman, include the songs "Papa, Can You Hear Me?" and "The Way He Makes Me Feel", both sung by Streisand. The film received the Academy Award for Best Original Song Score and the Golden Globe Awards for Best Motion Picture—Musical or Comedy and Best Director for Streisand, making her the first woman to have won Best Director at the Golden Globes.

Plot
Yentl Mendel is a woman living in an Ashkenazi shtetl named Pechev in Poland in 1904. Yentl's father, Rebbe Mendel (Nehemiah Persoff), secretly instructs her in the Talmud despite the proscription of such study by women according to the custom of her community. Yentl refuses to be married off to a man.

After the death of her father, Yentl decides to cut her hair short, dress like a man, take her late brother's name, Anshel, and enter a Yeshiva, a Jewish religious school in Bychawa. There she befriends a fellow student, Avigdor (Mandy Patinkin), and meets his fiancée, Hadass (Amy Irving). Upon discovering that Avigdor lied about his brother's death (a suicide, not consumption as Avigdor claimed), Hadass' family cancels the wedding over fears that Avigdor's family is tainted with insanity. Hadass' parents decide that she should marry Anshel instead, and Avigdor encourages Anshel to go ahead with the marriage, so Hadass can marry someone she knows rather than have a stranger for a husband. Anshel marries Hadass—to avoid Avigdor fleeing town—but, their marriage remains unconsummated, Anshel claiming it is a sin for a woman to give herself to a man while she loves another. Anshel starts to teach Hadass the Talmud. Meanwhile, Hadass develops romantic feelings for Yentl (as Anshel), while Yentl herself is falling in love with Avigdor.

Anshel leaves for a trip to the city with Avigdor that will take him away from home for a few days. In their lodging in the city, Anshel finally reveals his true identity to Avigdor. At first, Avigdor does not believe his friend is a woman, but Yentl proves her womanhood by showing him her breasts. When a confused Avigdor asks her why she didn't tell him, Yentl breaks down in his arms, showing she has revealed her real self to him out of love. Avigdor is stunned, but, after a moment, reciprocates the feeling  and remarks how beautiful Yentl's features are. The two kiss, but, Avigdor breaks away suddenly, remembering Hadass. Yentl assures him their marriage is not valid. Avigdor suggests he and Yentl elope. Yentl realizes that she will not be able to continue her studies if she marries Avigdor, and that she wants more from life than to be a wife. Yentl and Avigdor part ways, knowing they will always care for each other. It is implied that Hadass and Anshel's marriage is annulled, as it was never consummated. Avigdor returns to marry Hadass. In the following scene, the two are successfully reunited and reading a letter from Yentl, learning that she's going to a new place and will love them both always. Yentl leaves Europe on a boat bound for the United States, where she hopes to lead a life with more freedom. With a smile on her face, Yentl finishes her story by singing: "Papa, watch me fly."

Cast
 Barbra Streisand as Yentl Mendel
 Mandy Patinkin as Avigdor
 Amy Irving as Hadass Vishkower
 Nehemiah Persoff as Rebbe Mendel
 Steven Hill as Reb Alter Vishkower
 Allan Corduner as Shimmele
 David de Keyser as Rabbi Zalman
 Miriam Margolyes as Sarah
 Doreen Mantle as Mrs. Shaemen
 Lynda Baron as Peshe 
 Kerry Shale as Yeshiva Student

Production
The production of Barbra Streisand's film Yentl was a long and arduous process that delayed the project for over a decade.

After reading Isaac Bashevis Singer's story "Yentl: The Yeshiva Boy" in 1968, Streisand sought to make it her next film after her completion of Funny Girl. The screen rights were gained in 1969, with Streisand to be the star. In 1971, the Czechoslovakian director, Ivan Passer, was originally hired by First Artists to direct the film. Singer wrote the screenplay and retitled it "Masquerade", but because of his belief that Streisand's age and celebrity would detract from the film, Singer backed out.

In 1973, Streisand read Singer's story to her then-partner, producer Jon Peters, to gain further support for the film. However, like Passer, he was convinced that Streisand was too old and feminine to convincingly play the part the film would demand. By 1976, after completing  A Star Is Born (1976), Streisand became convinced that she was, in fact, too old to play the part in Yentl, and would take up the film as director. Because she had wanted to be both the star and director, studios continued to draw back from funding the film, with the fear that Streisand as a rookie director would be unable to responsibly handle a multi-million dollar project. Additionally, Streisand reported that studios claimed the film was "not commercial" because it was "too ethnic". In 1978, Streisand's friends, Alan and Marilyn Bergman, suggested that Yentl be re-imagined as a musical. It was hoped that a musical starring Barbra Streisand would be accepted and better received by a studio.

Jon Peters attempted to persuade Streisand to drop the project and perform at Wembley Stadium in London instead, for an offer of $1 million. She refused that offer, as well as a $2 million follow-up, to reconsider. Another offer by Peters, which was to be in excess of $10 million for Streisand to perform in Las Vegas, was also promptly turned down in favor of pursuing the Yentl project. Her attitude regarding her age quickly changed after she disguised herself as a man, temporarily confusing Peters into thinking that a stranger had broken into the house. Peters, now convinced of her ability to play a male, agreed to sign a three-year production contract with Orion Pictures in March 1978. To combat the age she was to play in the film, she changed Yentl from being 16 to 26.

According to various sources, Streisand became increasingly inspired and determined to bring Yentl into production when, in the summer of 1979, she and her brother Sheldon (Streisand) visited their father's grave at Mount Hebron Cemetery for the first time in 30 years. For the sake of making memory of the occasion, Streisand had her brother take a photo of her standing next to her father's tombstone. The photo revealed that Emmanual Streisand's grave was directly next to that of a man named Anshel, the name of Yentl's dead brother that Yentl adopts when she takes on a male identity. Intrigued, Streisand asked her brother to contact a psychic to perform a seance, convinced that her father was beckoning her from beyond the grave to complete the film.

In 1979, Streisand finally reached an agreement with Orion Pictures to direct and star in Yentl. She was working with a script by Ted Allen at the time, but discarded a majority of it, keeping the musical segments. The film was to be co-produced by Barbra's friends and associates: Joan Marshall Ashby and Jon Peters. To prepare for the film, Streisand exhaustively researched the many aspects of Judaism, ceremonies, relentlessly studied the Torah, and consulted numerous rabbis, one being Rabbi Lapin, whom Streisand appointed as the main religious consultant for the film.

Orion Pictures made the announcement that it had agreed to produce Yentl as Barbra Streisand's directorial debut in the late summer of 1980. Traveling to Prague with a Super-8 camera and song lyrics, Streisand scouted out film locations while also shooting film of herself walking through the city in costume with early recordings of Yentls soundtrack being played in the background. However, not long after her return, Heaven's Gate (1980), a Michael Cimino picture produced by United Artists, lost $35 million at the box office, bringing Orion to cancel all films that exceeded a $10 million production cost in order to preserve itself. Yentl, which was priced at $14 million, was cancelled. The film was turned down again and again until Jon Peters, Peter Gruber, and Neil Bogart formed PolyGram Pictures and agreed to produce the film. However, due to creative differences and personal disputes between Streisand and Peters, Yentl was dropped once again.

Fifteen years after its original conception and 20 script variations later, Yentls production finally began on April 14, 1982 in the Lee International Studios of London, after United Artists merged with MGM and gained the new leadership of Freddie Fields and David Begelman—Streisand's former agent from the late sixties. Yentl was green-lighted as Streisand's directoral debut at a budget of $14.5 million. Shooting concluded in October 1982, which was to be followed by Streisand requiring ten weeks to dub the soundtrack. In the end, the film went $1.5 million over budget, which Streisand paid for with her salary, as stated in the contract with UA.

Soundtrack

The soundtrack album to the film was released by Columbia Records in 1983.

Release
Yentl was successful at the box office, opening at number 5 at the US box office upon its limited-release weekend and stayed in the top 10 for 9 weeks, peaking at number three, in its third week. The film went on to gross more than $40,218,899 at the US and Canadian box office on a budget of $12 million, and was amongst the top 20 highest-grossing films of the year at the box office. Internationally it grossed $28.5 million for a worldwide total of $68.7 million.

Reception
 Metacritic gave the movie a score of 68 based on 11 reviews, indicating "generally favorable reviews". It's featured on the Top Ten Films of 1983 by National Board of Review.

Roger Ebert gave the film three and a half out of four stars, saying, "Yentl is a movie with a great middle ... the middle 100 minutes of the movie are charming and moving and surprisingly interesting."  In her review in The New Yorker, Pauline Kael wrote: "it has a distinctive and surprising spirit. It's funny, delicate, and intense—all at the same time." Jonathan Rosenbaum, for the Chicago Reader, praised Streisand's direction and Michel Legrand's music: "The results may be a little protracted, but Streisand gives it her best shot, and the music by Michel Legrand is memorable." Isaac Bashevis Singer, writer of "Yentl the Yeshiva Boy", the short story first published in English in 1983, said of Barbra Streisand's film adaptation: "I did not find artistic merit neither in the adaptation, nor in the directing."

In their 1985 Film Quarterly review, Allison Fernley and Paula Maloof lauded Streisand for departing from genre expectations, namely upholding Yentl as a strong female and therefore potential feminist role model rather than an accomplice in a male-dominated romance, for defying the expectations of the musical genre by choosing to give all musical parts to Yentl alone, and the "subversion of the cross-dressing genre" by refusing to end the film with a "comfortable reassuring heterosexual union" between Yentl and Avigdor, demanding the audience consider more serious questions about the role of societal conventions. Jack Kroll of Newsweek in 1983 called Streisand's control over the aesthetics of the film "a delight and at times an astonishment". Gary Arnold of The Washington Post observed an "uninspired score and other shortcomings" of the film, but saw its "exceptional charm and sentimental potency" as its saving grace. While she granted Streisand a sincere effort in creating Yentl, Janet Maslin's New York Times review in 1983 criticized Streisand's carelessness with certain aesthetic elements of the film as well as the ending, which she described as a "relatively harsh resolution", comparable to that of the original by I. B. Singer. Streisand responded publicly to Maslin, saying: "I spent more than ten years researching the material; how long did she spend on it?"

Home media
Yentl was released on home video in August 1984 on CBS/Fox Video (under license from MGM/UA Home Entertainment Group, Inc.). Another VHS was released by MGM/UA Home Video in 1989. It was released on DVD by Metro-Goldwyn-Mayer (under 20th Century Fox Home Entertainment) on February 3, 2009 as a two-disc "Director's Extended Cut" in the widescreen format. The DVD includes the theatrical cut, a director's extended cut with added scenes from Streisand's archives, an introduction by Streisand, an audio commentary with Streisand and Rusty Lemorande, deleted scenes including a storyboard sequence for a cut song, pre-rehearsal concepts and feature comparisons, stills galleries, and cast and crew info. A Blu-ray edition is being released by Twilight Time.

Awards and honors

Yentl won an Academy Award in 1984 for Best Adaptation Score, the award going to Michel Legrand (music), Alan Bergman (lyrics), and Marilyn Bergman (lyrics). Amy Irving was nominated for the Academy Award for Best Supporting Actress, and the film was also nominated for Best Art Direction/Set Decoration (Roy Walker, Leslie Tomkins, Tessa Davies). Barbra Streisand became the first woman to receive a Golden Globe for Best Director for the film, and Yentl was nominated for four other Golden Globes (Best Actress, Best Actor, Best Original Score and Best Original Song), also winning the award for Best Motion Picture—Musical or Comedy. The film also nominated in Best Album of Instrumental Score Written for a Motion Picture or Television Special. The film was chosen by Time magazine and National Board of Review as one of the top ten films of 1983.

Despite Streisand's historic Golden Globe win, she was not nominated for an Academy Award, causing much controversy.

Although Yentl garnered considerable critical acclaim, the film also received three Razzie Award nominations: Worst Actor for Streisand, Worst Supporting Actress for Irving, and Worst Musical Score. Irving is one of just three actors to be nominated for an Oscar and a Razzie for the same performance; the others are James Coco in Only When I Laugh and Glenn Close in Hillbilly Elegy.

The film is recognized by American Film Institute in these lists:
 2004: AFI's 100 Years...100 Songs:
 "Papa, Can You Hear Me?" – Nominated
 2006: AFI's 100 Years...100 Cheers – Nominated
 2006: AFI's Greatest Movie Musicals – Nominated

Themes
Yentl begins with the same premise as Singer's original story. Streisand's character is a young woman growing up in an oppressive society that will not let her pursue her religious education. She is told she must have the "soul of a man" because of her desire to learn. Her talent, curiosity and ambition are considered strictly masculine by her society and religious tradition. Unwilling to live without access to education on the basis of sex, Yentl leaves her home and conceals her sex to be able to pursue the scholarly occupation of a Jewish man. In doing so, Yentl inadvertently embarks on a journey of self-discovery that defies traditional ideas of gender roles within her community.

Yentl's defiance of social expectation and her reversal of traditional gender roles crosses deeply rooted religious boundaries, particularly once Yentl marries Hadass. Until this point, Yentl only adopts the appearance and occupation of a man, but now she lives as a man in a more complete sense, as a husband, occupying the traditionally male role in her household. Her identity as a woman, not only socially and religiously, but also personally and sexually, is called into question, as she occupies this role and develops an intimate, loving connection with Hadass, complete with hinted sexual chemistry.

In Singer's story, this dual betrayal of nature and the divine plan dooms Yentl to a life of pain, alienation, and shameful dishonesty. After her marriage ends in disaster, Yentl remains trapped forever in her disguise, unable to find redemption from her rejection of a normal life—a take on the legend of the Wandering Jew.

In Streisand's film, Yentl's defiance of expectation and definition, a rejection of sexist gender roles, is treated as a virtue. Though Yentl faces difficult choices in her attempt to live the life of her choosing, including sacrificing her love of Avigdor, she finds herself capable of following her dreams, of feeling different forms of love and intimacy with both sexes, as well as emerging from confusion and ambiguity with a powerful, independent sense of self-worth. At the film's conclusion, Yentl takes this developed, ever-evolving self to America to seek new possibilities and opportunities for discovery. Singer criticized the film's ending as hopelessly unrealistic, but the ending serves more as an affirmation of Yentl's independence and relentless optimism than a historically fitting conclusion to the narrative.

Throughout her complex interaction with Hadass and Avigdor, Yentl manages conflict with empathy and respect. Her difficult experiences expand, rather than trap her personality. She does not conform to expectations from her surroundings or from her audience, neither remaining merely a woman hiding in men's clothing nor revealing herself to be neutered or firmly homosexual. She refuses to accept a limited, traditional life, even when offered one in marriage to Avigdor. Rather, Yentl becomes a "real woman", thoroughly modern and encompassing "what society has defined as both masculine and feminine traits". In the end, her pain, her confusion, and her loss never destroy her hope or resolve. She remains assertive and defiant, daring to find or to create room for new self-definition and new possibility, without seeking simple or complete resolution to ongoing challenges in her constant thirst for more.

Although Isaac Bashevis Singer insisted that Yentl does not have feminist undertones, many critics and viewers of the film consider Yentl to be a feminist role model. One reason is that she rebels against patriarchal Orthodox Jewish society by disguising herself as a man to do what she loves—study the Torah. Another reason is that although she finds herself in love with Avigdor, she has the strength to leave him behind, in exchange for a freer life in the US.

Jewish-American themes
Streisand's interpretation of I. B. Singer's "Yentl the Yeshiva Boy" has philosophical implications as a Jewish-American film. Streisand changed Singer's specific ending, in which Yentl wanders off, presumably to a different yeshiva, to continue her studies and her cross-dressing. In the film interpretation of the story, Yentl moves on, but this time to the US. Viewers are led to believe that in the States she can have both study and womanhood. This idea symbolizes a refusal to conform to old-world Jewish standards and instead move "against the authority and authenticity of the Judaic past", which Streisand asserts has "propelled itself so far from the austerity of Talmudic study".

Often, Jewish-American immigrants who struck out on their own were unable to dedicate the amount of time and energy into text study that their ancestors had; their lives instead were characterized by an "individualism and experimentalism" that "Jewish immigrants and their descendants have so strikingly honored, reinforced, and revised". The differences between the written version of this story, which originated in Warsaw, and the American film interpretation thus symbolize a potential philosophical shift from the self-understanding of Eastern-European Jewry to Jewish-American self-understanding: it suggests America can potentially alter preexisting Jewish values.

Sexual themes 
Yentl blurs lines between male and female and its characters develop attractions that could be seen as homosexual, although the film upholds a heterosexual sensibility. Yentl's desire is exclusively for her study partner, Avigdor, while her marriage to a woman remains unconsummated and at times is comical.  Her choice to reveal herself as a woman to Avigdor in hopes of gaining his love firmly establishes her self-determination.

While Yentl does not take its characters outside the realm of heterosexuality, the film critically questions the "appropriateness of gender roles" as determined by society. Ultimately it argues that the society Yentl lives in does not allow equal opportunities for happiness for all people, especially women. In this way, it can be read as a potentially feminist text.

References

External links
 
 
 
 
 
 

1983 films
1980s musical drama films
1983 LGBT-related films
1980s romantic musical films
American musical drama films
American romantic musical films
Best Musical or Comedy Picture Golden Globe winners
Films set in 1904
Films set in Poland
Films that won the Best Original Score Academy Award
Cross-dressing in American films
1980s feminist films
Films scored by Michel Legrand
Films about Jews and Judaism
American films based on plays
Films based on works by Isaac Bashevis Singer
Films directed by Barbra Streisand
Same-sex marriage in film
Films with screenplays by Barbra Streisand
United Artists films
American historical romance films
LGBT-related musical drama films
Films shot in the Czech Republic
Barwood Films films
Metro-Goldwyn-Mayer films
Films produced by Barbra Streisand
Films based on adaptations
Films whose director won the Best Director Golden Globe
American historical musical films
1983 directorial debut films
Films about Orthodox and Hasidic Jews
Films about LGBT and Judaism
1983 drama films
1980s English-language films
1980s American films